Tatura is a town in the Goulburn Valley region of Victoria, Australia, and is situated within the City of Greater Shepparton local government area,  north of the state capital (Melbourne) and  west of the regional centre of Shepparton. At the 2021 census, Tatura had a population of 4,955.

During World War II, several internment camps were set up around Tatura by the Australian government. Four of these were for "enemy alien" civilians, and three were for prisoners of war. Between 1940 and 1947, there were 10,000 to 13,000 people in the internment camps at different times.

With a large corporate and manufacturing presence within the town, Tatura is a major employer within the Goulburn Valley. Attractions include the Cussen Park wetlands, the Wartime Camps, and Irrigation Museum. The name of the town is an Aboriginal word meaning "small lagoon."

History 
The Post Office opened on 1 February 1875. The Tatura Magistrates' Court closed on 1 January 1990.

World War II internment camps 

 

Several internment camps were set up around Tatura, Rushworth, and Murchison (Dhurringile) by the Australian government during World War II. Four of these were for "enemy alien" civilians, and three were for prisoners of war. Australian law in 1939 designated people "enemy aliens" if they were Germans or were Australians who had been born in Germany; later, it covered Italians and Japanese as well. The majority of the "enemy aliens" were refugees fleeing the Nazis. Between 1940 and 1947, there were 10,000 to 13,000 civilians interned in the camps at different times.

Before the war, Britain was home to around 73,000 Germans, who had left Germany due to the rising tensions and the rise of the Nazi regime in the country. Many of these were also young male Germans who had been in schools in Britain before the outbreak of WWII. In June 1940, France fell to Nazi Germany and Allied soldiers were evacuated from Dunkirk. The British government ordered the internment of ‘enemy aliens’ (unnaturalised people born in enemy countries). This included both long-term residents of Britain, as well as recent refugees who were fleeing Nazi oppression, all of whom were regarded as potential spies or Nazi sympathisers.

They were shipped out of the country in the middle of the war, predominantly to Australia (on the HMT Dunera from Britain in September 1940) and Canada.

The camps, in rural Australia, were surrounded by two or three parallel rows of perimeter fences of barbed wire up to 10 feet in height, separated by Dannert wire (razor wire that formed in large coils which can be expanded like a concertina), and by 20-foot-high guard towers, manned by sentries with rifles, Vickers machine guns, or Bren guns, as well as by sentry-manned catwalks, with banks of floodlights 60 to 80 feet high. Soldiers were instructed that familiarity with Internees "should be avoided at all times." Tatura Intgernment Camps 3 and 4 were opened in 1940.

Tatura Internment Camp 1, part of a Tatura complex of seven internment camps, was built by the Commonwealth on land that it acquired compulsorily from a farmer, with construction completed by February 1940.

Among the more notable internees, interned by Australia for two years as "enemy aliens" in Tatura Interment Camp 3 starting with their arrival in 1940 as they fled Austria, were Jewish refugee from the Nazis (and artist and inventor) (Polish-Jewish) Slawa Horowitz Duldig, who had invented and patented the modern folding umbrella in 1929, along with her Polish-Jewish refugee sculptor husband Karl Duldig, and their daughter Eva Duldig (from the ages of two to four); Eva two decades later represented Australia at the Wimbledon Championships in tennis.

Similarly, artist Ludwig Hirschfeld-Mack had been forced to leave Germany during the rise to power of the Nazis due to his part-Jewish heritage. However, upon arrival in Australia he was deemed an "enemy alien," and interned in interment camps including Tatura, from 1940 to 1942. Another person interned as an "enemy alien" at Tatura was composer Felix Werder, son of a Berlin synagogue cantor.

In 1941, German Templers were shipped from the German Templer Colonies in Palestine and interned for the duration of the war.  After arriving in Australia on 25 August 1941, the Templers were housed in Camp 3 in Tatura. Using the experience gained during internment in Egypt in World War I, they quickly established a school and a kindergarten, as well and developed work routines to prevent depression. After the war, the majority of Templer families remained in Australia. The Temple Society Australia was established in 1950.

In 1941, Major Julian Layton arrived from England on a mission.  Layton, a Jew like many of the Dunera internees, managed to secure the release of many of them if they enlisted in the British or Australian Army. At the end of the war all of the Dunera internees were released.

Also notable were the crew of the German auxiliary cruiser Kormoran, taken prisoner following the battle between HMAS Sydney and the Kormoran. They were housed at Camp 13, Murchison, and Dhurringile mansion. There were also about 500 German civilians detained during the Anglo-Soviet invasion of Iran in August 1941 and housed initially in the Loveday, S.A.camps, before transfer to the Tatura camps in 1945.

The Tatura German Military Cemetery is the final resting place of 351 German civilians and servicemen who died during internment in World War I and World War II.

Industry, agriculture, and food
Organisations in Tartura include Tatura Milk Industries, Goulburn-Murray Water's corporate headquarters, Jacobs Engineering Group, the Department of Environment and Primary Industries (Victoria), as well as major regional processing plants for multinational corporations such as Unilever and Snow Brand Milk Products.

The Tatura Show is held yearly in March and International Dairy Week (which is the second-largest dairy show in the Southern Hemisphere) in January each year attracting over 6,000 exhibitors, vendors and onlookers from Australia as well as overseas. The Taste of Tatura Food and Wine Festival is held on the first Sunday in March.

Tatura Hot Bread won prizes in the Professional Section of The Great Australian Vanilla Slice Triumph in 2006, and again in 2007.

Sport
Tatura has many sporting facilities located within the town, including Australian Rules football ovals, soccer fields, cricket pitches, tennis courts, Lawn Bowls greens, a multipurpose indoor stadium and the 18-hole golf course of the Hilltop Golf Club.
The town has an Australian Rules football team competing in the Goulburn Valley Football League, the Tatura Bulldogs.

Tatura tennis club hosts an annual labour day round-robin tennis tournament on the grass courts each March. 

Tatura is home to the Tatura Racecourse Reserve, where the Tatura & Shepparton Racing Club Inc hosts a minimum of three full TAB race meetings each season, including the Italian Plate Festival in December – a celebration of the local Italian community and culture – and the Tatura Easter Cup. The Cup day also features the Mark Goring Memorial race, honouring jockey Mark Goring who died of injuries sustained in a fall at the Tatura track in 2003. As well as a Western & Quarter Horse arena and Club rooms, the Reserve is a thoroughbred training facility, with grass and sand track, and swimming facilities as well as practice barriers and jumps schooling course. 20 Racing Victoria-licensed trainers are registered to the Racecourse. In addition to race meetings, the club also runs regular official trials and jumpouts (unbroadcast trials).

Education
Tatura has two primary schools serving both the town and surrounding areas: Tatura Primary School is a public school located south of the town centre, whilst Sacred Heart School is a private school located on the town's main street. Due to Tatura's proximity to Shepparton, secondary education options include Notre Dame College, Shepparton, Wanganui Park Secondary College, Goulburn Valley Grammar School, Mooroopna Secondary College, Shepparton High School, and McGuire Secondary College.

Tatura is located 20 minutes from La Trobe University Shepparton Campus as well as the Goulburn Ovens Institute of TAFE which both offer a range of tertiary and TAFE courses for the Goulburn Valley.

Media
The main print publications distributed within Tatura include the daily Shepparton News, the weekly The Adviser Shepparton, the weekly Tatura Guardian, and the monthly Tatura Bulletin.

References

External links
 
 Wartime Camps and Irrigation Museum
 Tatura German Military Cemetery
 Tatura Milk Industries

Towns in Victoria (Australia)
City of Greater Shepparton